Rasulpur is a town situated in Jhang District, Punjab, Pakistan.

References

Populated places in Jhang District
Jhang District